The Virtual Museum of Soviet Repression in Belarus is a non-commercial project of oral history from historians and other scientists from Belarus. Created as a virtual museum, it covers Soviet repression in Belarus.

Background
In 2007, the Belarusian Christian Democracy party launched a campaign called "Repentance". The campaign began meeting with former prisoners of camps, record their memories, and collect materials on the subject of repression.

In 2012, an independent civic initiative was formed, which began to create a Virtual museum of Soviet repression in Belarus. The basis for the museum was materials collected during the campaign "Repentance".

In 2014, a website for the virtual museum was created. The museum is only available online; there is currently as of 2020 no physical exhibition of the material.

Concept of the museum
The museum operates with an approach of oral history by presenting recordings of inhabitants of Belarus who report on their personal experiences with Repression during the Soviet time. The museum covers a part of Belarusian history that is mainly excluded from current Belarusian official historiography.

The content of the exhibition consists of recordings of audio- and video-recollections, photographs, documents, and statistics connected with repression in Belarus. Also, a chronicle of the repression in Belarus and some historical articles are included.

, the museum includes seven showrooms:

 Soviet myths 
 Chronology of repression 
 Victims of repression 
 The system of repression 
 Anti-Soviet resistance 
 Rehabilitation 
 Commemorative culture

Among the museum's special features are, besides the narrative interviews, inter alia interactive maps of the NKVD in Belarus, and memorials on repression.
In addition the museum offers a victim-search option with more than 30.000 records.

Partners
Among the partners of this project are Konrad Adenauer Foundation and the Belarusian Oral History Archive project.

See also
 Soviet repressions in Belarus
 Kurapaty
 Gulag
 Virtual museum
 Museum of Occupations and Freedom Fights
 Museum of Soviet Occupation, Kyiv

References

External links
 Virtual Museum of Soviet Repression in Belarus website
 Belarusian Oral History Archive project

2014 establishments in Belarus
Internet properties established in 2014
Museums established in 2014
Virtual museums
History museums in Belarus
World War II museums
Anti-communism in Belarus
Museums of communism